PerfectDraft is a beer tapping system from Belgian company AB-InBev and Dutch company Philips. The device is similar to the installations for tapping beer at parties, however it works with steel, returnable six-litre-kegs. As of 2022, more than 50 different beers are available for use with the PerfectDraft Home Draught machine. When left in the machine, the kegs will be stored at the temperature of 3°C and correct pressure. One keg lasts for up to 30 days.

The PerfectDraft Home Beer Tap chills a 6-litre keg to 3 degrees in 12 hours or less. It requires no additional gas containers as the machine pumps up beer through an internal compressor pump.

See also 
 BeerTender
 Senseo

References

Beer vessels and serving

nl:Thuistap